Arthur Christopher Watson , (2 January 1927 – 7 May 2001) was a diplomat and politician, in which he held the position of Governor of Montserrat, Governor of the Turks and Caicos Islands and the British High Commissioner to Brunei.

Biography 
Watson was born in China, and educated at Norwich School from 1940 to 1945, Selwyn College in 1945, St. Catherine's College from 1948 to 1950, and London University from 1950 to 1951. Earning his Bachelor of Arts (BA) in 1950 and Master of Arts (MA) in 1953. Then he had a short career in the Royal Navy from 1945 to 1948, becoming a sub-lieutenant in the Royal Naval Volunteer Reserve (RNVR). He began work with the Her Majesty's Overseas Civil Service (HMOCS) Uganda from 1951 to 1963, becoming a District Officer at the same time in 1953. He retired as the Principal Assistant Secretary in 1961, Secretary in the Office of the Governor from March to October 1962, retired form HMOCS in 1963, and later First Secretary at the Commonwealth Relations Office on 4 June 1963, Consular in Karachi from 1964 to 1967, and the First Secretary to the Foreign and Commonwealth Office (FCO) In November 1967.

He served as Commissioner of Anguilla from 1971 to 1974. He was then the Governor of the Turks and Caicos from May 1975 until July 1978. He then served as Governor of Montserrat from 1985 until 1987. Watson was also the last British High Commissioner to Brunei before independence, serving from October 1978 until independence on 1 January 1984.

Honours 

  Order of St Michael and St George Companion (CMG)

References

1927 births
2001 deaths
People educated at Norwich School
Alumni of St Catharine's College, Cambridge
Alumni of Selwyn College, Cambridge
Alumni of the University of London
British civil servants
Companions of the Order of St Michael and St George
Governors of Montserrat
Governors of the Turks and Caicos Islands
High Commissioners of the United Kingdom to Brunei
British expatriates in China